Daniel Hardy Jr. (born September 7, 1987) is a former professional football tight end. He was selected by the Tampa Bay Buccaneers in the seventh round of the 2011 NFL Draft. He played college football at the University of Idaho in the Western Athletic Conference and is a 2006 graduate of West High School in Anchorage, Alaska. Hardy now lives in Pasadena, California, with his wife, Mariah Van Horne. They were married September 2, 2017 in Kennewick, Washington. Hardy serves as a family pastor at Fellowship Monrovia in Monrovia, California.

College statistics
In 2008 Daniel Hardy had 9 catches for 128 yards and 2 touchdowns in 7 games. In 2009 Hardy had a breakout season with 39 catches for 691 yards and 3 touchdowns in 12 games. During his senior year of 2010 Hardy had 32 catches for 545 and 1 touchdown in 8 games. Up until a broken arm sidelined him for the final 5 games of the year, he was leading the nation in receiving yards for tight ends. Hardy finished his college career with 80 catches for 1,364 yards and 6 touchdowns over 27 games.

Professional career

Tampa Bay Buccaneers

Hardy was drafted by the Tampa Bay Buccaneers in the 7th round of the 2011 NFL Draft. He was cut on September 3, 2011. He was re-signed to the practice squad 2 days later but was released on September 6, 2011.

New Orleans Saints

Hardy was signed to the New Orleans Saints practice squad on November 22, 2011. He was with the team through the 2012 playoffs, for a total of 8 weeks.

Minnesota Vikings

Hardy signed a futures contract with the Vikings on January 19, 2012. He was released on May 2, 2012.

References

External links
Idaho Vandals bio
NFL.com bio

1987 births
Living people
Players of American football from Anchorage, Alaska
American football tight ends
Idaho Vandals football players
Tampa Bay Buccaneers players